Lewis John Nainby (born 2 January 1940), sometimes referred to as John Nainby, is an English former footballer who played as a forward in the Football League for Darlington. He was on the books of Sheffield Wednesday without playing first-team football for them. He scored seven goals for Blyth Spartans in a Northern Counties League match against Stockton in December 1961.

References

1940 births
Living people
People from Whitley Bay
Footballers from Tyne and Wear
English footballers
Association football forwards
Sheffield Wednesday F.C. players
Darlington F.C. players
Blyth Spartans A.F.C. players
English Football League players